Staurochaeta is a genus of parasitic flies in the family Tachinidae.

Species
Staurochaeta albocingulata (Fallén, 1820)
Staurochaeta grisea Mesnil, 1963

References

Diptera of Europe
Diptera of Asia
Exoristinae
Tachinidae genera
Taxa named by Friedrich Moritz Brauer
Taxa named by Julius von Bergenstamm